Ella Johnson (June 22, 1919 – February 16, 2004) was an American jazz and rhythm and blues singer.

Music career
Born Ella Mae Jackson in Darlington, South Carolina, United States, she joined her brother Buddy Johnson in New York as a teenager, where he was leading a popular band at the Savoy Ballroom. Her singing drew comparisons to Ella Fitzgerald and Billie Holiday.

Johnson scored her first hit with "Please, Mr. Johnson" in 1940. Subsequent hits included "Did You See Jackie Robinson Hit That Ball?", "When My Man Comes Home" and "Hittin' On Me". Her popular 1945 recording of "Since I Fell for You", composed by her brother, led to its eventual establishment as a jazz standard. She continued to perform with Buddy Johnson into the 1960s. AllMusic noted that her "later solo sides for Mercury are pale imitations of her work with the band."

In February 2004, she died of Alzheimer's disease in New York at the age of 84.

Discography
 Swing Me with Buddy Johnson (Mercury, 1958)

With Buddy Johnson
 Rock and Roll (Mercury, 1956)
 Go Ahead and Rock Rock Rock (Roulette, 1959)
 Say Ella (Juke Box, 1983)

References

1919 births
2004 deaths
People from Darlington, South Carolina
American jazz singers
American rhythm and blues singers
East Coast blues musicians
Jump blues musicians
Deaths from dementia in New York (state)
Deaths from Alzheimer's disease
20th-century American singers
20th-century American women singers
21st-century American women